Mausolea is a genus of flowering plants in the chamomile tribe within the daisy family.

Species
There is only one known species,  Mausolea eriocarpa, native to Kazakhstan, Turkmenistan, Uzbekistan, Afghanistan, and Iran.

References

Anthemideae
Flora of Asia
Plants described in 1852